The H.B. William House is a historic house located at 1509 South Orange Avenue in Sarasota, Florida.

Description and history 
The two-story, Mediterranean Revival style house was designed by prominent local architect Thomas Reed Martin and was completed by mid-December 1926. It was added to the National Register of Historic Places on March 22, 1984.

References

External links

 Sarasota County listings at National Register of Historic Places
 Florida's Office of Cultural and Historical Programs
 Sarasota County listings
 H.B. William House

Houses on the National Register of Historic Places in Sarasota County, Florida
Houses in Sarasota, Florida
Houses completed in 1926
Mediterranean Revival architecture in Florida